Alfred Jefferis Turner (3 October 1861, in Canton – 29 December 1947, in Brisbane, Queensland, Australia) was a pediatrician and noted amateur entomologist.  He was the son of missionary Frederick Storrs-Turner. He introduced the use of diphtheria antitoxin to Australia in 1895. He was known by the nickname "Gentle Annie".

Doctor Turner was a resident of Dauphin Terrace, Highgate Hill, Brisbane.

The Jefferis Turner Centre for mothercraft was opened in 1952 as part of the Queensland Government's Maternal and Child Welfare program. In 1986, its role was changed to provide short term respite care for intellectually disabled children. It is located in the heritage building Fairy Knoll in Ipswich.

Medical career 
Doctor Jefferis Turner studied medicine at University College London graduating with first class honours. He emigrated to Australia in 1888 and the next year became first medical officer of the Royal Children's Hospital, Brisbane.

His clinical research and influence helped to reduce the number of children's deaths in Queensland. He made notable contributions in the areas of diphtheria anti-toxin, hookworm-induced anaemia, lead poisoning, improvement of the quality of milk supply for children, health education for expectant and nursing mothers, and the establishment of antenatal clinics in Queensland.

Doctor Turner played a pivotal role in combating the bubonic plague epidemic of 1900 and in making the notification of tuberculosis compulsory in 1904.

Due to his mild manner and love of children, he acquired the nickname of 'Gentle Annie'.

Entomological activity 

In addition to his medical career, Turner was a noted amateur entomologist specialising in Lepidoptera. He left a collection of over 50,000 moths to the Council for Scientific and Industrial Research, Canberra.

References

External links 

Australian entomologists
Australian taxonomists
 01
1861 births
1947 deaths
Australian paediatricians
19th-century Australian zoologists
20th-century Australian zoologists